Son of Word Jazz is the second album by voice-over and recording artist Ken Nordine with the Fred Katz Group which was released on the Dot label in 1958.

Reception

The Allmusic site rated the album 3 stars stating "There doesn't seem to be as much thought put into the sequel; though a number of moments are every bit as good as the material found on the first album, there's also a lot more meandering this time around, and some real puzzlers".

Track listing
All compositions by Ken Nordine and Fred Katz
 "The Smith Family" – 1:59
 "Miss Cone" – 2:43
 "Outer Space" – 3:37
 "Down the Drain" – 3:12
 "Secretary" – 3:01
 "Bubble Gum" – 2:36
 "Looking at Numbers" – 2:21
 "Anytime, Anytime" – 2:20
 "I Used to Think My Right Hand Was Uglier Than My Left" – 2:15
 "Lemming" – 2:18
 "The Bullfighter" – 2:50
 "Junk Man" – 4:35

Personnel
Ken Nordine – narration
Fred Katz – cello 
Paul Horn – woodwinds
John Pisano – guitar 
Richard Marx – piano
Harold Gaylor – bass 
Red Holt – drums

References

Dot Records albums
Ken Nordine albums
1958 albums